André Lonlas (5 June 1910 – 21 October 2003) was a French long-distance runner. He competed in the men's 10,000 metres at the 1936 Summer Olympics.

References

1910 births
2003 deaths
Athletes (track and field) at the 1936 Summer Olympics
French male long-distance runners
Olympic athletes of France
Place of birth missing